Edmonton-Calder was a provincial electoral district in Alberta, Canada, mandated to return a single member to the Legislative Assembly of Alberta using the first past the post method of voting from 1971 to 1993 and again from 1996 to 2019.

History
The first Edmonton-Calder electoral district was created in the 1971 boundary redistribution from the electoral districts of Edmonton North West and Edmonton North. It was abolished in 1993 to create parts Edmonton-Mayfield and Edmonton-Roper.

Calder was re-created in the same general area out of Mayfield and Roper in the 1996 boundary redistribution. The 2010 electoral boundary re-distribution lead to significant changes to the district, the northern boundaries were pushed from 137 Avenue to the Edmonton city limits between 127 Street and 184 Street into land that used to be part of Edmonton-Castle Downs. The south boundary which used to run along Stony Plain Road was pushed north to Yellowhead Trail ceding land to Edmonton-Meadowlark and Edmonton-Glenora.

Edmonton-Calder was dissolved prior to the 2019 Alberta general election and re-distributed into Edmonton-City Centre, Edmonton-West Henday and Edmonton-North West electoral districts.

Boundary history

Electoral history

The electoral district has existed twice since it was first created in 1971. The election held that year saw a hotly contested race between Social Credit incumbent Edgar Gerhart who had been MLA for the old electoral district of Edmonton Northwest and Progressive Conservative candidate Tom Chambers. On election night Chambers defeated Gerhart with just over 50% of the popular vote. His party went on to form its first government that election .

Chambers won his second term in 1975 with a landslide majority of almost 75% of the popular vote. He would be appointed to a cabinet portfolio in the government of Peter Lougheed in 1979. Chambers was re-elected twice more in 1979 and 1982 with shrinking majorities. He retired from office at dissolution in 1986.

The 1986 election was won by NDP candidate Christie Mjolsness. She had previously run against Chambers in the 1982 election and increased the percentage of her popular vote and won on the collapse of the Progressive Conservative vote despite losing raw popular vote. She was re-elected in 1989 in a hotly contested battle with Liberal candidate Lance White.

The riding was abolished in 1993 and redistricted to make Edmonton-Mayfield and Edmonton-Roper. Mjolsness would run for re-election in Roper and be defeated while White would run in Mayfield and be elected defeating incumbent Alex McEachern.

Calder would be re-created out of the two ridings in the 1996 boundary redistribution. White and McEachern would face each other for the second time with White coming out the victor. White would win just over 40% of the popular vote while McEachern finished in third place.

The riding would change hands in 2001 in a very closely contested election as Progressive Conservative candidate Brent Rathgeber defeated White with just over 40% of the popular vote. The NDP would return to office in the next election as NDP candidate David Eggen defeated Rathgeber by a close margin with just over 36% of the popular vote.

The 2008 election would see Eggen defeated by Progressive Conservative candidate Doug Elniski in another close race, with Elniski picking up 41% of the popular vote to Eggen's 40%. Elinski announced his retirement, and did not run again in the 2012 election.

David Eggen was returned to office in the 2012 general election and in the 2015 general election. The 2012 election was another close race, with under 4% difference between Eggen and PC Bev Esslinger. During the 2015 election, Eggen was re-elected with over 70% of the popular vote, marking one of the best results for the provincial NDP in the province.

Legislature results 1971-1993

1971 general election

1975 general election

1979 general election

1982 general election

1986 general election

1989 general election

Legislature results 1997-present

1997 general election

2001 general election

2004 general election

2008 general election

2012 general election

2015 general election

Senate nominee results

2004 Senate nominee election district results

Voters had the option of selecting 4 Candidates on the Ballot

Student Vote results

2004 election

On November 19, 2004 a Student Vote was conducted at participating Alberta schools to parallel the 2004 Alberta general election results. The vote was designed to educate students and simulate the electoral process for persons who have not yet reached the legal majority. The vote was conducted in 80 of the 83 provincial electoral districts with students voting for actual election candidates. Schools with a large student body that reside in another electoral district had the option to vote for candidates outside of the electoral district then where they were physically located.

2012 election

See also
List of Alberta provincial electoral districts

References

Further reading

External links
Elections Alberta
The Legislative Assembly of Alberta

Former provincial electoral districts of Alberta
Politics of Edmonton